Veleropilina goesi is a species of monoplacophoran, a superficially limpet-like marine mollusc. It is found off the Virgin Islands in the Caribbean Sea.

References

Monoplacophora
Molluscs described in 1988